William Livingstone Cunningham (born 11 July 1938) is a Scottish former footballer who played as a wing half for St Mirren, Third Lanark, Barnsley and Stirling Albion. He played in the 1959 Scottish League Cup Final which Third Lanark lost to Heart of Midlothian.

References

External links 

1938 births
Living people
Footballers from Paisley, Renfrewshire
Association football wing halves
Renfrew F.C. players
Scottish footballers
St Mirren F.C. players
Third Lanark A.C. players
Barnsley F.C. players
Stirling Albion F.C. players
Scottish Junior Football Association players
Scottish Football League players
English Football League players